Swapnadanam is a 1976 black-and-white Malayalam-language film that marks the directorial debut of K. G. George. A marital psychodrama, it rejected all the usual song-dance numbers of popular cinema, yet succeeded in reaching the common mass. The film was a commercial success while maintaining its artistic quality. It won the Kerala State Film Award for Best Film and National Film Award for Best Feature Film in Malayalam. The cast includes Rani Chandra, Dr. Mohandas, Soman, Mallika and P. K. Venukuttan Nair.

Plot
The story proceeds in flashbacks as the protagonist, Dr. Gopi, who has had a nervous breakdown, relives his past under psychiatric probing. It is the story of an ill-matched marriage — the husband, sensitive, introvertive and plagued by memories of a bygone love and the wife, rich, spoilt and self-centred — and how under the mounting stresses of daily life, the husband cracks up. Gopi is the only son of a widowed mother, and in strained circumstances, is put through medical college by his rich uncle on the understanding that Gopi marries his daughter Sumithra. Gopi, while in college, falls in love with a fellow-student, but they part company when his mother meets the girl and persuades her to give up the betrothed Gopi. Gopi's marriage with his rich cousin takes place, but it is doomed from its very start. They are not made for each other in either taste or temperament, and besides Gopi is haunted by memories of his former love. And Gopi, being the introvert he is, consummates the marriage, as it were, in a psychiatric ward.

Cast
 Rani Chandra as Sumithra
 Dr. Mohandas as Gopi/Parameshwaran
 Soman as Mohan
 Mallika Sukumaran as Rosi Cheriyan
T. R. Omana as Gopi's mother
 P. K. Venukuttan Nair as Sumithra's father 
 Prema Menon as Kalyani
Sonia Isaac Thomas as Kamalam
P. K. Abraham as Psychiatrist Venugopal
Isaac Thomas as Psychiatrist
Anandavalli
KPAC Azeez

Soundtrack
The music was composed by Bhaskar Chandavarkar and the lyrics were written by P. J. Eezhakkadavu.

References
2. Swapnadanam: Sensuality and psychology of this dream land

External links
 

1970s Malayalam-language films
Films directed by K. G. George
Best Malayalam Feature Film National Film Award winners